Below is a partial list of TV specials that were previously aired on television network, Radio Philippines Network. For the currently aired shows of the network, please see the list of programs broadcast by CNN Philippines.

Previously aired specials

Sports coverages

1973 Asian Basketball Confederation Championship Manila
Asian Games (1974–1982)
1984 Summer Olympics
1988 Summer Olympics
1991 Southeast Asian Games
1992 Dunhill Golf Cup
1994 Women's Volleyball Grand Prix Manila
2008 Summer Olympics
2010 Winter Olympics
2010 Youth Olympics
2019 Southeast Asian Games
Boxing At The Bay (2009–2011)
Donaire vs Concepcion
Donaire vs Darchinyan
Donaire vs Maldonado
Donaire vs Martinez
Donaire vs Montiel
First Strike: Francisco vs Vasquez Fight
Galindez vs Johnson (January 15, 1980)
Mayweather vs Mosley
NBA on RPN
NBA Finals (2005–2007,  2009–2010)
NBA All-Star Weekend (2005–2007,  2009–2010)
NCAA March Madness on RPN (1973–1997)
Pacquiao vs Barrera 1
Pacquiao vs Barrera 2
Pacquiao vs Clottey
Pacquiao vs Cotto
Pacquiao vs Dela Hoya
Pacquiao vs Diaz
Pacquiao vs Hatton
Pacquiao vs Fahsan
Pacquiao vs Margarito
Pacquiao vs Marquez 1
Pacquiao vs Marquez 2
Pacquiao vs Morales 1
Pacquiao vs Morales 2
Pacquiao vs Morales 3
Pacquiao vs Solis
Pacquiao vs Velasquez
Pride and Glory: The Sonsona-Hernandez Fight
Star Olympics (2001-2005)
The Flash and the Furious
Thrilla in Manila (1975)
UAAP Basketball (1991-1994) (produced by Silverstar Communications)
UEFA Champions League Final on RPN (1980–1999)
UEFA Cup Winners' Cup Final on RPN (1980–1999)
UEFA European Championship on RPN (1976–1996)
Viloria vs Iribe
Viloria vs Tamara
Viloria vs Ulysses
WWE Fatal 4Way (2010)
WWE Royal Rumble (2010)
WWE SummerSlam (2010)
WWE TLC: Tables Ladders & Chair (2010)
WWE Wrestlemania 26 (2010)
World Series on RPN (1970–1983)
Matchfight (1982-2011)

¹With 9TV

Election coverages
Pollwatch '80 (January 30–31, 1980)
Pollwatch '81 (June 16–17, 1981)
Pollwatch '84 (May 14–15, 1984)
Pollwatch '86 (February 7–8, 1986)
Pollwatch '87 (May 11–12, 1987)
Pollwatch '88 (January 18–19, 1988)
Pollwatch '92 (May 11–12, 1992)
Pollwatch '95 (May 8–9, 1995)
Elections '98 (May 11–12, 1998, together with MBC and Manila Bulletin)
Bantay Halalan 2001 (May 14–15, 2001, together with IBC 13, RMN, Manila Standard and Manila Bulletin)
Hatol ng Bayan: Kampanya 2004 
Hatol ng Bayan 2007 
Hatol ng Bayan: AutoVote 2010 
The Filipino Votes: Election Day 2016 (May 9–10, 2016)
The Filipino Votes: Election Day 2019 (May 13, 2019)
The Filipino Votes: Elections 2022 (May 9, 2022)

Special events
Academy Awards (1961-2007)
American Music Awards (2010)
The Live Coverage of Apollo 11 on 9 (August 16, 1969)
Binibining Pilipinas (1966-1986)
FAMAS Awards (1985-2003)
Gawad Urian
Golden Globe Awards¹ (2009, 2010)
Metro Manila Film Festival Awards Night¹ (1990-2009)
Metro Manila Film Festival Parade of Stars¹ (1990-2009)
Miss Asia-Pacific (1968-1989, 1992-2000)
Miss Earth (2001)
Miss Philippines Earth (2001)
Miss Supranational 2021 (August 22, 2021)
Miss Supranational 2022 (July 16, 2022)
Miss Teen USA (1993-2006)
Miss Universe (1970-1975*, 1996-1997, 1999-2006)
Miss USA (1983-2006)
Miss World (1966-1997, 2002-2004)
Miss World Philippines 2022 (June 5, 2022)
Mister Supranational 2022 (July 17, 2022)
Mutya ng Pilipinas (1968-1990, 1993-2000)

(*RPN was the official TV network of the Miss Universe Pageant in Manila in 1974.)

TV specials
1996 Clio Awards (December 3, 1996)
2000 Today (December 31, 1999-January 1, 2000)
45th RPN Anniversary Concert Special (July 2005)
Aiza Seguerra: Bow! (1988)
Aliwan Festival TV Special (2005-2008)
American Idol (season 11) Grand Finale¹ (May 24, 2012)
American Idol (season 12) Grand Finale¹ (May 17, 2013)
Ang Bagong Kampeon Grand Finals (1984–1989)
Battle Of The Brains Grand Finals (1991-2000)
Bayan Batas Balita: The RPN 9 Presidential Forum (1998)
The Best of Jabbawockeez¹ (December 22, 2009)
Catholic Mass Media Awards (1985-1999, 2000-2001)
CNN Philippines The Filipino Votes: Senatorial Debate (April 27, 2019)
CNN Philippines The Filipino Votes: Senatorial Forum (January 16 – May 1, 2022)
CNN Philippines The Filipino Votes: Presidential Debate (February 27, 2022)
CNN Philippines The Filipino Votes: Vice Presidential Debate (February 26, 2022)
Clear Men Future League Finals TV Special¹ (2008)
Earth Day Concert TV Special (1996-1999)
EDSA 25th Anniversary¹ (February 25, 2011; together with NBN)
Emmy Awards TV Special (1990-2007)
Ewan McGregor: Cold Chain Mission¹ (December 30–31, 2013; together with UNICEF)
Grammy Awards¹ (2009, 2013)
Guy & Pip TV Special (1969)
Ikon ASEAN Grand Finals¹ (2007)
Ikon Philippines Grand Finals¹ (2007)
Jose Mari Chan Special (1988)
KBP Golden Dove Awards (1986-1994)
La Aunor, Beyond Time (1994)
Make My Day Musical Special (December 27, 1997)
Martin Nievera and Regine Velasquez World Concert Tour (2003)
Metro Manila Popular Song Festival Grand Finals (1978-1985)
Miss World Philippines Grand Coronation Night (June 6, 2022)
MTRCB Movie Awards¹ (2010)
MTRCB Television Awards¹ (2009-2010)
The Muppets Celebrate Jim Henson Tribute Special (1990)
National Collegiate Cheerleading Championships (January 15, 1980)
National Quiz Bee Finals (1980–2007)
Ninoy: Sa Dambana ng Kagitingan (August 20, 2003)
Opposing Views Special: 2014 Philippine Intercollegiate Debating Championship Finals¹ (April 11, 2014)
Paalam... Pangulong Cory (August 1–5, 2009, together with NBN and IBC 13)
Pareng Dolphy: Tatanda Ka Rin, Ate Guy
Pasikatan Sa 9 Grand Finals (1991-1993)
Philippine Military Academy Graduating Exercises (March, yearly)
Philippines' Next Top Model Grand Finals¹ (2007)
PMPC Star Awards for Movies (2000-2007)
PMPC Star Awards for Music¹ (2009-2010)
PMPC Star Awards for Television¹ (1987, 2000-2004, 2006-2007)
Project Runway Philippines (season 3) Grand Finale¹ (May 13, 2012)
Public Briefing: #LagingHandaPH (March 23, 2020–January 2021)
Panata Sa Bayan:2022 KBP Presidential Forum (February 4, 2022) 
Puso at Diwa ni Ninoy
Rated Prime at 43: The RPN 43rd Anniversary Special (July 2003)
RPN Homecoming TV Special (1979)
Skechers Street Dance Battle Finals Night¹ (2011-2012)
Star Search Sa 9 Grand Finals (1993)
The Struggle is my Life: Nelson Mandela story¹ (December 6, 2013)
Superstar: Nora Aunor's 22nd Showbiz Anniversary @ Araneta Coliseum (1988)
Teen Choice Awards 2013 (August 12, 2013)
Thalia Live in Manila (1996)
Town Hall: Servant Leadership (February 2014)
The World of Mother Teresa (December 5, 1996)

¹with ETC/SNC, now CNN Philippines

Christmas specials
Christmas Message and Urbi et Orbi Blessing Live from Vatican City¹ (December 25, 2015 – present)
Christmas Midnight Mass Live from Vatican City¹ (December 25, 2015 – present)
Christmas In Our Hearts TV Special (1990)
Christmas Story: Telling by Lolo Larry Henares (December 23, 1997)
Disney's Very Merry Christmas Parade TV Special (1992)
Isabella's Christmas Dreams Concert (December 19, 1994)
Joyous Sounds Of Christmas (1992)
Misa de Aguinaldo with Fr. Mario Sobrejuanite @ Cultural Center of the Philippines¹ (December 25, 2015)
Pamasko sa Bagong Taon: The RPN Christmas Special 2002 (December 8, 2002)
Superstar Beyond Time: A Christmas Special (December 21, 1994)
Walt Disney's Very Merry Christmas Parade (December 24, 1996)

¹With CNN Philippines

Year-end specials
On The Cusp of Change: 2013 Solar News Channel Year-Ender Report (December 30, 2013)
CNN Philippines Rewind 2016 (December 30, 2016)
CNN Philippines Rewind 2017 (December 30, 2017)
CNN Philippines Rewind 2018 (December 30, 2018)
CNN Philippines Rewind 2019 (December 30, 2019)
2020: A Year Like No Other (December 30, 2020)
CNN Philippines Rewind 2021 (December 30, 2021)

New Year specials
Countdown Around the World 2017 (December 31, 2016 – January 1, 2017)
Countdown Around the World 2018 (December 31, 2017 – January 1, 2018)
Countdown Around the World 2019 (December 31, 2018 – January 1, 2019)
CNN Philippines New Year Celebrations Around the World (December 31, 2019 - January 1, 2020)
CNN Philippines New Year Celebrations Around the World (December 31, 2020 - January 1, 2021)
CNN Philippines New Year Celebrations Around the World (December 31, 2021 - January 1, 2022)

Holy Week specials
The 700 Club Holy Week Specials (produced by CBN Asia, Inc., 1995)
Awa, Unawa, Gawa (produced by JesCom, 2021)
Bo Sanchez Lenten Special (produced by Kerygma TV & Shepherds Voice, 2005)
Celebration Of The Lord's Supper (1987–2007)
Eat Bulaga Holy Week Drama Special (1981-1988) (now currently aired on GMA Network, 1995-2009; 2014-2019; 2023-present)
The Explorer Of St. Francis Xavier Documentary Special (produced by JesCom, 2005)
Gabay Sa Pagiging Santo (produced by JesCom, 2022)
GenRev: Generation Revival Holy Week TV Special (2004-2005)
Greater Love: In Memory of Richie Fernando (produced by JesCom, 2005)
The Greatest Adventure: Stories From The Bible (1995)
Inang Simbahan: Ang Kuwento Ng Manila Cathedral (produced by JesCom, 2021)
Kuwentong Buhay: Mga Kuwento Ng Pagbabalik Loob (produced by Jescom, 2021)
Pasasalamat (produced by JesCom, 2021)
Power To Unite Holy Week Specials¹ (2007-2010) (now aired on GMA Network 2015-present)
Preacher In Blue Jeans (produced by Kerygma TV & Shepherds Voice, 2005)
Sangandaan (produced by JesCom, 2021)
The Seven Last Words¹ (1985-2010) (now on IBC 13)
Shalom 3-Day Lenten Retreat Special @ Araneta (1995-2007) (now on IBC 13)
Sharing In The City Lenten Special (1978-2006)
Siete Palabras sa Sto. Domingo - Seven Last Words at Sto. Domingo (live at Sto. Domingo Church, Quezon City) (1987-2008) (GMA Network, 2009-present)
Stories: Art of the Cross¹ (April 15, 2014)
Stories: Bible Mysteries. Revelations¹ (April 14, 2014)
Sumasampalataya Ako (produced by JesCom, 2021)
Via Crusis: Sa Mga Yapak Ni Hesus (produced by JesCom, 2021)

¹in cooperation with Solar

See also
List of programs broadcast by CNN Philippines
List of programs previously broadcast by Radio Philippines Network

References

Radio Philippines Network Network specials